Dino Domenico Natali is an American stage and television actor. He is best known for playing the role of the gay police officer, "Officer Zatelli" on five episodes on the American sitcom television series Barney Miller.

Natali co-starred with Pasquale Esposito, in the PBS documentary film Pasquale Esposito Celebrates Enrico Caruso, in 2015. He has also guest-starred in television programs including, Get Smart, The Lucy Show, The Harvey Korman Show, Kojak, House Calls, Stir Crazy and Joe Bash. Natali made an small appearance in his first film debut in the 1979 film Love at First Bite, playing the role of the "Man Outside Castle".

Filmography

Film

Television

References

External links

Rotten Tomatoes profile

People from San Francisco
Male actors from San Francisco
American people of Italian descent
American male television actors
20th-century American male actors